Hypertext fiction is a genre of electronic literature, characterized by the use of hypertext links that provide a new context for non-linearity in literature and reader interaction. The reader typically chooses links to move from one node of text to the next, and in this fashion arranges a story from a deeper pool of potential stories. Its spirit can also be seen in interactive fiction.

The term can also be used to describe traditionally-published books in which a nonlinear narrative and interactive narrative is achieved through internal references. James Joyce's Ulysses (1922), Enrique Jardiel Poncela's La Tournée de Dios (1932), Jorge Luis Borges' The Garden of Forking Paths (1941), Vladimir Nabokov's Pale Fire (1962), Julio Cortázar's Rayuela (1963; translated as Hopscotch), and Italo Calvino's The Castle of Crossed Destinies (1973) are early examples predating the word "hypertext", while a common pop-culture example is the Choose Your Own Adventure series in young adult fiction and other similar gamebooks.

In 1969, IBM and Ted Nelson from Brown University gained permission from Nabokov's publisher to use Pale Fire as a demonstration of an early hypertext system and, in general, hypertext's potential. The unconventional form of the demonstration was dismissed in favour of a more technically oriented variant.

Definitions 
There is little consensus on the definition of hypertext literature. The similar term cybertext is often used interchangeably with hypertext. In hypertext fiction, the reader assumes a significant role in the creation of the narrative. Each user obtains a different outcome based on the choices they make. Cybertexts may be equated to the transition between a linear piece of literature, such as a novel, and a game. In a novel, the reader has no choice, the plot and the characters are all chosen by the author; there is no 'user', just a 'reader'. This is important because it entails that the person working their way through the novel is not an active participant. In a game, the person makes decisions and decides what actions to take, what punches to punch, or when to jump.

To Espen Aarseth, cybertext is not a genre in itself; in order to classify traditions, literary genres and aesthetic value, texts should be examined at a more local level. To Aarseth, hypertext fiction is a kind of ergodic literature:

In ergodic literature, nontrivial effort is required to allow the reader to traverse the text. If ergodic literature is to make sense as a concept, there must also be nonergodic literature, where the effort to traverse the text is trivial, with no extranoematic responsibilities placed on the reader except (for example) eye movement and the periodic or arbitrary turning of pages.

To Aarseth, the process of reading immersive narrative, in contrast, involves "trivial" effort, that is, merely moving one's eyes along lines of text and turning pages; the text does not resist the reader.

History 

The first hypertext fictions were published prior to the development of the World Wide Web, using software such as Storyspace and HyperCard. Noted pioneers in the field are Judy Malloy and Michael Joyce. Grove Press published Richard Horn's Encyclopedia in 1969, a non-linear story organized in a series of alphabetical encyclopedia entries.

Douglas Cooper's Delirium (1994) was the first novel serialized on the World Wide Web; it permitted navigation between four parallel story strands. On June 21, 1996, Bobby Rabyd (aka Robert Arellano) published the World Wide Web's first interactive novel, Sunshine 69, with navigable maps of settings, a nonlinear calendar of scenes, and a character "suitcase" enabling readers to try on nine different points of view. Shortly thereafter, in 1997, Mark Amerika released GRAMMATRON, a multi-linear work that was eventually exhibited in art galleries. In 2000, it was included in the Whitney Biennial of American Art.

In the 1990s, women and feminist artists took advantage of hypertext and produced dozens of works. Linda Dement’s Cyberflesh Girlmonster a hypertext CD-ROM that incorporates images of women’s body parts and remixes them to create new shapes. Dr. Caitlin Fisher’s hypertext novella These Waves of Girls is set in three time periods of the protagonist exploring her queer identity through memory. The story is written as a reflection diary of the interconnected memories of childhood, adolescence, and adulthood. It consists of an associated multi-modal collection of nodes including linked text, still and moving images, manipulable images, animations, and sound clips. It won the Electronic Literature Organization award.

Some other web examples of hypertext fiction include Six Sex Scenes (1995) by Adrienne Eisen (pen name for Penelope Trunk), Stuart Moulthrop's Hegirascope (1995, 1997), The Unknown (which won the trAce/Alt X award in 1998), The Company Therapist (1996-1999) (which won Net Magazine's "Entertainment Site of the Year"), and Caitlin Fisher's These Waves of Girls (2001) (which won the ELO award for fiction in 2001). More recent works include Stephen Marche's Lucy Hardin's Missing Period (2010) and Paul La Farge’s Luminous Airplanes (2011).

The internationally oriented, but US based, Electronic Literature Organization (ELO) was founded in 1999 to promote the creation and enjoyment of electronic literature. Other organisations for the promotion of electronic literature include trAce Online Writing Community, a British organisation, started in 1995, that has fostered electronic literature in the UK, Dichtung Digital, a journal of criticism of electronic literature in English and German, and ELINOR, a network for electronic literature in the Nordic countries, which provides a directory of Nordic electronic literature. The Electronic Literature Directory lists many works of electronic literature in English and other languages.

Characteristics 
Hypertext fiction is characterized by networked nodes of text making up a fictional story. There are often several options in each node that directs where the reader can go next. Unlike traditional fiction, the reader is not constrained by reading the fiction from start to end, depending on the choices they make. In this sense, it is similar to an encyclopaedia, with the reader reading a node and then choosing a link to follow. While this can be done more easily on paper, it is quite a different experience on a screen. The reader can be thrown into unpredictable loops because not all of the links are explained by their title. The fiction can contain text, quotes, and images.

There are different forms that hypertext fiction can take. These forms are axial, arborescent, and networked. Axial hypertext fictions have a central story line with links that branch off and return to the central storyline. Arborescent fictions branch into mutually exclusive story lines, and networked fictions have multiple starting points and do not always have a set ending. A single work of hypertext fiction can have a mixture of these three forms.

Criticism 
In 2013, Wired published an article on why hypertext fiction did not become popular, claiming that non-linear stories are difficult to write, since each section of the work would need to introduce characters or concepts.

See also 
Cybertext
Gamebook
Homestuck
253 (novel)
Hypertext poetry
Interactive novel
SCP Foundation
Storyspace
Text adventure
Twine (software)
Visual novel
17776

References

Bibliography
 
 
 "The hypertext Tristram Shandy page", David R. Hammontree's page
 The Non-linear Tradition in Literature from The Electronic Labyrinth by Christopher Keep, Tim McLaughlin and Robin Parmar
 
 Ensslin, Astrid (2007). Canonizing Hypertext: Explorations and Constructions. London: Continuum.

External links 
The Shaping of Hypertextual Narrative (by Sergio Cicconi)

Narrative forms
Web fiction
Fiction